Colonae or Kolonai was a deme in ancient Attica, originally of the phyle of Antiochis, but later in the phylae of Antigonis (307/6 – 224/3 BCE) and Ptolemais (after 224/3 BCE).

Its site is tentatively located near modern Varnava Tower.

References

Populated places in ancient Attica
Former populated places in Greece
Demoi